The 1968 BRSCC British Saloon Car Championship, was the eleventh season of the series. The Royal Automobile Club Motor Sports Association (RACMSA) took control of the championship this year from the BRSCC. Australian driver Frank Gardner successfully defended his 1967 title, changing from a Ford Falcon to contest Class C, initially with a Ford Cortina Lotus until the new Ford Escort was introduced.

Calendar & Winners
All races were held in the United Kingdom. Overall winners in bold.

Championship results

References

British Touring Car Championship seasons
Saloon